"Dirty Desire" is a song by Japanese-American singer-songwriter Utada. The single was released exclusively in the fourth quarter of 2009 as a promotional single to US dance/club radio.  The single later received a digital commercial release in December 2009 and peaked on the Billboard Dance/Club Charts at number 16.

Composition 

The song itself is about fantasizing over someone who is already in a relationship (somewhat similar to Tippy Toe from 2004's EXODUS). It features repetition of the title, as though "dirty desire" is the only thing that can be thought of when thinking of said person. It has playful lyrics, with Utada toying with her Japanese heritage with the line "And in my fantasies I love you long time".
The song itself features synths and a very prominent drum beat, that lasts throughout the entire song. It finishes with the repeated line "Bring that beat back!" before fading out.

Promotion and reception 
In a review of This Is the One, Adam Benjamin Irby of Bleu Magazine called "Dirty Desire" his favourite song from the album, partly due to its "in-your-face sexual departure from her past work", and going on to say the song is "pure pop perfection".
Not all reception was positive, as Daniel Robson of The Japan Times stated that the song is almost x-rated, particularly on the line "During my 9 to 5 / I'm thinking six and nine". He also added "Is this what it takes to find Stateside success? Whoring yourself both musically and lyrically?".

Track listing

 also known as the "Mike Rizzo Funk Generation Club Mix"

Charts

Weekly charts

Release history

References 

2010 singles
Hikaru Utada songs
Songs written by Hikaru Utada
Songs written by Tricky Stewart
Song recordings produced by Tricky Stewart
2010 songs